Mohamed Fawzi (5 March 1915 – 16 February 2000) was an Egyptian general and politician who served as minister of defense.

Early life and education
Fawzi was born in Abbasiya, Cairo, on 5 March 1915. He attended the Egyptian Royal Military Academy and graduated in 1936. He also held a master's degree, which he received from the same institution in 1952.

Career
During the 1948 Arab–Israeli War, Fawzi first met Gamal Abdel Nasser and served as the commander of anti-aircraft artillery in Deir Suneid. In 1957, Fawzi was appointed by President Nasser as commander of the Military Academy. In 1961, Fawzi headed the Egypt's military mission as part of the UN forces in Congo. He became military secretary-general of the Arab League in March 1964. He was also made chief of staff that month, a post he occupied until the Six-Day War in June 1967.

After the war, Fawzi resigned from his office and was replaced by Abdel Moneim Reiad in the post. On 11 June 1967 Fawzi was appointed general commander, replacing Abdel Hakim Amer in the post. Amer and his allies protested the move and immediately afterward, 600 officers loyal to Amer besieged army headquarters demanding Amer's reinstatement and threatening to oust Fawzi. Tensions between Amer, who was a plotting a coup to be launched on 27 August, and Nasser mounted. A plan to apprehend Amer was made, and Nasser managed to convince him to meet in his home. While Amer was at Nasser's home, Fawzi led an army takeover of Amer's villa, confiscating all of thirteen truckloads of his weapons.

In January 1968, Fawzi was appointed defense minister. He also became one of the members of the Supreme Executive Committee of Egypt the same year. Fawzi continued to serve as defense minister during the era of next President Anwar Sadat. However, Fawzi and six other ministers resigned from office in May 1971. These individuals who were close to Nasser are called the May Group. Mohammed Sadek replaced Fawzi as defense minister.

Arrest and sentence
Immediately after his resignation, Fawzi was arrested due to his alleged role in a coup plot. In May 1971, Sadat announced that Fawzi had been under house arrest. Fawzi was tried and sentenced to life imprisonment. His sentence was reduced to 15 years at hard labor by Sadat in December 1971. Fawzi was pardoned in 1974 due to health concerns and his military background.

Later years and death
In his later years, Fawzi published books on military affairs and gave lectures. He also published a biography. He joined Arab Democratic Nasserist Party, being a member of its political bureau.

Fawzi died on 16 February 2000 in Heliopolis in Cairo.

References

Bibliography

External links

20th-century Egyptian politicians
1915 births
2000 deaths
Defence Ministers of Egypt
Egyptian generals
Egyptian Military Academy alumni
Chiefs of the General Staff (Egypt)
Politicians from Cairo
Egyptian politicians convicted of crimes
Egyptian prisoners sentenced to life imprisonment